Bethoron, also Beth-Horon, was the name of two adjacent ancient towns strategically located on the Gibeon-Aijalon road, guarding the "ascent of Beth-Horon". The towns are mentioned in the Hebrew Bible and in other ancient sources: Upper Bethoron appears in Joshua and Lower Bethoron in Joshua and 1 Chronicles and I Maccabees 3:16.

The ancient towns of Upper Bethoron and Lower Bethoron are identified respectively with the present day Palestinian Arab villages of Beit Ur al-Fauqa and Beit Ur al-Tahta, which are believed to preserve the ancient names.

Etymology

The Hebrew name Bethoron (Beit Horon) is derived from the name of an Egypto-Canaanite deity, Horon, mentioned in Ugaritic literature. The city is mentioned among the cities and towns smitten by Sheshonq I in his inscription at the Temple of Karnak as Batae Houarn.

History
Upper Bethoron is mentioned several times in the Hebrew Bible. It is first mentioned in the Book of Joshua as a city on the border between the tribes of Benjamin and Ephraim. It is later mentioned in 2 Kings as one of the cities built and fortified by Solomon (also in ).

According to 1 Chronicles 7:24, Lower Bethoron was built by She'era, daughter of Beriah, son of Ephraim. Eusebius' Onomasticon mentions the 'twin villages' and St. Jerome describes them as 'little hamlets.'  From Egyptian sources (Muller, As. und Europa, etc.) it appears that Bethoron was one of the places conquered by Shishak of Egypt from Rehoboam.

The borderline between Benjamin and Ephraim passed alongside the two Bethorons (Joshua 16:5; 21:22) who belonged to the latter Israelite tribe and therefore, later on, to the Northern Kingdom of Israel, while the tribe of Benjamin adhered to the Kingdom of Judah. Solomon "built Beth-horon the upper, and Beth-horon the nether, fortified cities, with walls, gates, and bars" (2 Chronicles 8:5; 1 Kings 9:17). One or both of the towns was a Levitical city (Joshua 21:22; 2 Chronicles 6:53).

When Joshua utterly defeated the kings of the Amorites "he killed a large number of them at Gibeon, and chased them by the way of the 'Ascent of Beth-horon.'(Joshua 10:10) When the Philistines opposed King Saul at Michmash they sent a company of their men to hold "the way of Beth-horon."

This pass ascends from the plain of Aijalon (now Ayalon-Canada Park) and climbs to Beit Ur al Tahta (1,210 ft.). It then ascends along the ridge, with valleys lying to north and south, and reaches Beit Ur al-Fauqa (2,022 ft.).

Second Temple period
During the Second Temple period, the region immediately surrounding Bethoron had been traversed by many armies, with traces of an ancient Roman paving still visible. The Syrian general Seron was defeated here by Judas Maccabeus 
(1 Macc. 3:13-24) in the Battle of Beth Horon. Six years later Nicanor, retreating from Jerusalem, was defeated and slain. (1 Macc. 7:39); (Josephus, Antiquities Bk12 Ch10:5)

Bacchides repaired Beth-horon, "with high walls, with gates and with bars and in them he set a garrison, that they might work malice upon ("vex") Israel" (1 Macc. 9:50,51). Later, the Jews fortified it against Holofernes (Judith 4:4,5). 

In the Battle of Beth Horon (66) in the year 66 CE, the first decisive Jewish victory in the First Jewish–Roman War the Roman general Cestius Gallus was driven in headlong flight before the Jews.

Late antiquity 
Eusebius mentions the two Bethorons in their Biblical contexts, noting Joshua's victory and the fortification by King Solomon. 

Jerome (late 4th to early 5th centuries) noted that Bethoron was just a little village at his time. In his eulogy for Saint Paula, he describes Lower and Upper Bethoron as cities founded by Solomon and destroyed by war.

Later history 
The two Palestinian Arab Muslim villages of Beit Ur al-Fauqa and Beit Ur al-Tahta preserve the Hebrew–Canaanite name, and have been identified as the sites of Upper and Lower Bethoron. In 1915, the Palestine Exploration Fund wrote that changes in the main road to Jerusalem had left the Bethoron route "forsaken" and "almost forgotten". 

The Israeli settlement of Beit Horon was founded in 1977 on a site adjacent to the two towns. Highway 443 follows part of the ancient road.

Archaeology
Archaeological finds indicate that the lower town was established before the upper one. Potsherds from the Late Bronze Age onward were discovered at Lower Beit Ur, whereas those in Upper Beit Ur date only from the Iron Age onward.

References

Bibliography

Masterman, E. W. G. (1915).BETH-HORON. International Standard Bible Encyclopedia, Orr, James, retrieved December 9, 2005.

External links
 Israel Antiquities Authority report on the discovery of a burial cave in Beit 'Ur al-Tahta

Levitical cities
Tribe of Ephraim
Geography of the West Bank
Ancient Jewish settlements of Judaea